The 2017 Westchester County Executive election was held on November 7, 2017. After a primary in September, State Senator George Latimer was chosen as the Democratic Party candidate to challenge incumbent County Executive Rob Astorino. Latimer defeated Astorino, 56.6%-43.4%.

Primaries

Democratic

General election

References

2017 New York (state) elections